The Women's 10 km competition of the 2022 European Aquatics Championships was held on 21 August.

Results
The race was started at 10:00.

References

2022 European Aquatics Championships